Kuttrame Thandanai is a 2016 Tamil language neo noir psychological thriller film  cinematographed and directed by M. Manikandan and produced by S. Harihara Naganathan, S. Muthu, S. Kaleeswaran under Don Production, co produced with Tribal Art Productions.

This film starring Vidharth, Pooja Devariya and Aishwarya Rajesh in the leading roles. Supporting role played by Rahman, Nassar, Guru Somasundaram, G. Marimuthu and Yogi Babu Played guest appearances.

This film is written by M. Manikandan and Anand Annamalai, music score by Ilaiyaraaja (without songs), edited by Anucharan (Kirumi fame director and editor), production designed by Balasubramanian and Vijay Aadhinathan.

The film is based on the novel "Crime and Punishment" by Fyodor Dostoevsky. The film follows the story of a man with tunnel vision, who is slowly going blind and cannot afford the surgery to fix his eyes. When he witnesses a young woman's murder, the suspects offer him large sums of money to remain quiet and he inadvertently gets stuck in between two parties. The film released on 2 September 2016 to positive reviews, following several screenings at film festivals worldwide.

Plot
Ravi, a young man suffering from tunnel vision, works as a collection boy in a credit card collection office. Anu is his senior officer, and also a close friend. Ravi lives in a housing colony, which is surrounded by many flats. He lives on the first floor and opposite to his house on the ground floor lives Swetha, a young woman who appears to be modern and carefree. Ravi always watches her from his balcony and sometimes watches her secretly. She is often visited by a few men. One of them is her boss Vijay Prakash, who brings her a gift on his birthday and the other seems to be her boyfriend Arun. One day Ravi sees Arun coming out of her house angry and stares at him as he drives away.

Ravi is getting treatment for his eye condition and his doctor says his condition could only get worse in the future and needs an eye transplant, which would cost him ₹ 3,20,000. As he doesn't have enough money, he tries to apply for a loan from his boss, which is rejected.

One night, Ravi sees Vijay Prakash coming out of Swetha's house with a panicked expression and gets back inside suddenly and locks the door. Ravi gets suspicious and goes down and enquires him about Swetha. He calls him inside and shows him Swetha, who is lying dead in a pool of blood. Ravi assumes that Vijay Prakash has killed Swetha and gets angry. But Vijay Prakash offers him a deal to remain quiet, despite claiming that he did not kill her and if his name is involved in her death, then it may affect his name and business in the society. So in order to get his eye condition cured, Ravi agrees to remain quiet and takes ₹ 3,20,000 from Vijay Prakash. Vijay and Ravi part ways.

Ravi visits the hospital to pay the money for his treatment, but is told that the full amount for surgery will be ₹ 4,82,000 instead of ₹3,20,000 due to some miscellaneous charges. Disappointed, Ravi calls Vijay Prakash for more money but he refuses to pay any more saying that their deal is over. Meanwhile, police start investigating and start enquiring everyone in the colony and finally visit his house too. He initially says he doesn't know anything, but as he is angry at Vijay Prakash for not giving him money, he informs the police that he saw a man near Swetha's house on the night of the murder.

The police takes him to the station and begin to enquire, at the same time Arun (Swetha's boyfriend) is in the station applying for anticipatory bail, saying that he never knew anyone named Swetha. Ravi identifies Arun as the man he saw on the night of the murder to the police and Arun is considered as the prime suspect. Ravi tries to contact Vijay Prakash again but his phone is switched off. With Anu's help, he gets his number and meets him again, threatening that he will inform him to police and strikes a deal again, this time for ₹ 2,00,000 rupees.

Ravi goes to the hospital again and is informed that his name is registered for surgery and is on the waiting list to get a suitable donor and is told that he must wait for a long time. Frustrated, Ravi shouts at the hospital employees and is enraged. An employee says him that if he pays ₹ 5,00,000 extra as a bribe, his name will pushed up the order and his surgery will take place soon.

Ravi is clueless as to what to do. One night he is met by Balan who was sent by Arun's advocate and he offers him a deal to remain quiet in the court, as Ravi is the only witness in this case. Ravi agrees for a deal of ₹ 5,00,000 but Arun's side offer him only Rs.1,00,000 as advance and the remaining money after the hearing of the case. Ravi half heartedly agrees and takes the one lakh.

While walking back home Ravi is attacked by a stranger. Ravi guesses that it must be the work of Vijay Prakash and visits him. He threatens Vijay Prakash saying that he will reveal everything to his family if he doesn't agree to his deal. and Ravi demands ₹ 25,00,000. Enraged, Vijay Prakash shouts at him saying that he did not kill Swetha but eventually agrees to pay Ravi and also confesses that he had an affair with Swetha.

In the court, Arun is cross-examined in front of the judge and he too says that he had a relationship with Swetha but argued and left when she brought up marriage. Ravi falsely states that he saw Arun on the day of the murder and withholds the fact that she was seen alive after he left and the judge announces the verdict of life imprisonment and fine for Arun as the killer. Arun's lawyer and father are shocked. Ravi returns ₹ 1,00,000 to them and returns home. His house owner asks him to vacate his house for a relative so he starts packing his things. Meanwhile Anu has been fired for helping him find Vijay Prakash's number.

Ravi has a secret mobile phone in which the wallpaper is a photo of him and Swetha together. It is then revealed that Ravi and Swetha were in a relationship and Swetha started avoiding him after knowing about his eye condition. Also she turns out to be unfaithful, sleeping with many men for her pleasure and profits. This enrages Ravi and he asks her to come with him and he is ready to accept her. She refuses and insults Ravi. So Ravi kills her in a fit of rage and escapes.

Finally Ravi is met on the road by the lady doctor who initially diagnosed him with this eye condition and tells him that, his condition is indeed incurable and he will become blind despite an eye transfer. She was forced to lie to him because of the hospital pressure and leaves.

Ravi is totally heartbroken and regrets that he did a big mistake. Some years later, Ravi has moved to Kolkata. He has married Anu, who is pregnant, and is completely blind. The film ends by showing that Ravi's mistakes were indeed the punishment.

Cast

 Vidharth as Ravichandran
 Aishwarya Rajesh as Swetha
 Pooja Devariya as Anu
 Rahman as Vijay Prakash
 Guru Somasundaram as Balan
 Srinish Aravind as Arun
 Nassar
 G. Marimuthu as Police officer
 Madhusudhan Rao
 Yogi Babu as Auto passenger
 George Maryan
Pasi Sathya
 Rajasekhar
 Mona Bedre as Doctor

Production
Manikandan had committed to direct Kutrame Thandanai produced by the brothers of actor Vidharth, before the director had made Kaaka Muttai (2015). The film's shoot began production in October 2014 with Vidharth and Pooja Devariya portraying the lead roles. Manikandan then approached actress Aishwarya Rajesh to portray an interesting role in the film, and though the actress initially turned down the offer, she later chose to feature in the film. Ilaiyaraaja was signed on to compose the film's background music. The film was shot over a period of 33 days in Chennai and Kolkata.

Soundtrack
"Manthira Kanne" - Sri Ram, Amirtha

Release
Prior to its theatrical release, the film premiered at a few international festivals, including the New York Indian Film Festival and Mumbai  International Film Festival. The film had a worldwide theatrical release on 2 September 2016 and received critical acclaim. Behindwoods.com noted that it was a "technically sound thriller film", while Rediff.com noted "despite the ordinary performances, the gripping plot, engaging screenplay and care to technical details make director Manikandan's Kutrame Thandanai an interesting watch". A critic from The New Indian Express wrote "with its mature unconventional take on a crime scene, and its international feel and sensibility, Kuttrame Thandanai does Tamil cinema proud", adding that Manikandan displays "out-of-the-box-thinking, an intriguing screenplay and deft narration". The satellite rights of the film were sold to Zee Tamizh. Baradwaj Rangan of the Hindu called it "Thoughtfully made, but something's missing" in his review.

References

External links
 

2016 films
Films scored by Ilaiyaraaja
2010s Tamil-language films
2016 psychological thriller films
Tamil-language psychological thriller films
Films shot in Kolkata
Films about blind people in India
Films directed by M. Manikandan